Swamp People is an American reality series that was first broadcast on History on August 22, 2010. The show follows the day-to-day activities of alligator hunters living in the swamps of the Atchafalaya River Basin who hunt American alligators for a living.

Format
Alligator season in Louisiana begins on the first Wednesday in September and lasts for 30 days. In this time, many of the alligator hunters, following a tradition dating back about 300 years, earn most of their yearly income in a high risk vocation dependent on experience and the whims of weather within strict regulation by wildlife laws. Hunters are each issued a certain number of tags that must be attached to their kills; once they "tag out" (run out of tags), their season is over, and they may no longer kill any more alligators for the rest of the season. During this 30-day window, some of these hunters earn most of their annual income culling alligators; therefore, the ultimate goal for the alligator hunters is to tag out before the season ends.  Most of the hunters spend the rest of the year harvesting other species (fish, crawfish, shrimp, crabs, raccoons, turtles, etc.) to augment their yearly incomes and/or holding down full-time jobs in other industries.

Each season, the series focuses on various teams of alligator hunters. Some episodes also feature other aspects of the social and sporting life of the swamp, including fishing and hunting for other animals.

Beginning with the fourth season, the program expanded to venues outside the Atchafalaya River Basin, featuring gator hunting crews in other parts of Louisiana, as well as the swamplands of Texas.

Cast members
Sources:

Current

Previous

Mitchell Guist's death
On May 14, 2012, Mitchell Guist suffered an accident on the Belle River near Pierre Part.  According to authorities he slipped and fell while loading items onto his boat. It was initially reported that he suffered a seizure, but it is unclear whether the seizure was a result of the fall or if it was caused by a medical condition. It was later revealed that Guist suffered a heart attack. Guist was pronounced dead at a Morgan City hospital; the coroner for Ascension Parish later determined that his death was due to natural causes.  Guist was 47 years old at the time of his death. The Voodoo Bayou episode, originally aired on May 17, 2012, was dedicated in Guist's memory.

Broadcast history
The series premiered on August 22, 2010, and set a ratings record for History. The show was initially broadcast on Sunday nights at 10:00 p.m. ET/PT.

Season Two saw the show move from Sunday to Thursday, again at 10:00 p.m. ET/PT. The season was met with great success and record breaking viewers for the History channel.

For Season Three, Swamp People moved one hour earlier to 9:00 p.m. ET/PT on Thursday nights. The show returned to that night and time for its fourth season, on February 14, 2013, later moving an hour later to 10:00 p.m. ET/PT on May 30, 2013 after Pawn Stars moved to Thursdays at 9:00 p.m. ET.

For Season Five, Swamp People moved to Monday nights at 9:00 p.m. ET / PT and will continue in to do so for the beginning of Season Six.

Season Six premiered on February 2, 2015 and ended on July 13, 2015. After the end of Season Six, a majority of the cast members were let go after a new producer was bought in, and only a few of the original cast members remained. It was also announced that Season Seven would be the final season, which was met with much pushback from the fanbase.

Season Seven premiered on February 8, 2016 with the newest episode set to air on May 2, 2016. It was announced on April 28, 2016 via Jacob Landry's Facebook page that History had ordered an eighth season of the series. This season premiered on February 16, 2017.

Later seasons of Swamp People went back to airing on Thursday nights, usually at 9:00 p.m. ET/PT or 10:00 p.m. ET/PT.

Episodes

As of February 3, 2023, 233 episodes of Swamp People have aired, currently in the 14th season.

Reception
The series opener of Swamp People premiered on August 22, 2010. The series premiere garnered 3.1 million total viewers, 2.5 million adults 25–54 and 2.3 million adults 18–49 – driving The History Channel to #1 in cable within the 10-11 p.m. time period in total viewers and Adults 25–54.

Episode 1 of season 2 premiered on March 31, 2011. The second season premiere drew 3.9 million total viewers, and increased 26% versus the season 1 average (3.1 million). It was the series' most-watched episode ever. Swamp People captured 2.0 million adults age 18–49 and age 25–50 impressions up +25% and +18% from the season 1 average respectively (1.6 million A18-49 and 1.7 million A25-54).

The final episode of season 2 was met with record breaking viewers and ratings. The final episode drew 5.5 million viewers. It drew 2.8 million adults 25-54 and adults 18-49 – scoring the #1 show on cable for the night and the #2 spot in all of television. The season overall averaged 4.1 million viewers for the season, which was up 32% versus season 1.

Spinoff Shows
On October 21, 2012, a spinoff of Swamp People, Outback Hunters, debuted on the History Channel. Following the same format as Swamp People, the series focuses on crocodile hunters in the Top End of Australia's Northern Territory. Its first season, consisting of 11 episodes, ended on December 30, 2012.

A second spinoff, Swamp Mysteries With Troy Landry,  started airing on the History Channel on June 7, 2018. The spinoff follows Troy Landry collaborating with local experts to capture local problem creatures across the Southern United States. The show consisted of one season with six episodes, the last of which aired on July 12, 2018.

A third spinoff, Swamp People Serpent Invasion started airing on the History Channel on March 9, 2020.  It features Troy and Chase Landry and Bruce Mitchell teaming with Florida natives Zak Catchem and Bill Booth to eradicate pythons from the Everglades, where they are an invasive species. The series lasted for two seasons and twelve episodes.

Mobile app games
Two mobile app games were produced as a tie-in to the show:
 Choot'Em Angry Swamp (also known merely as Angry Swamp), is an arcade-style game featuring Troy Landry, and is available for Apple, Android Google Play and Kindle Amazon.
 The self-titled Swamp People (also known as The Swamp People Game), is a hunting simulation game, and is available for Apple and Android-supported devices.

Home releases

References
https://kreolmagazine.com/culture/features/edgar-family-making-a-living-in-the-blue-economy/#.XmqOOsBE0lQ

External links
 
 
https://kreolmagazine.com/culture/features/edgar-family-making-a-living-in-the-blue-economy/#.XmqOOsBE0lQ

2010 American television series debuts
History (American TV channel) original programming
Television shows set in Louisiana
Television shows set in Texas
Cajun culture
Hunting in popular culture
English-language television shows